The BMW New Six (also known as the BMW E3) is a line of mid-size luxury sedans and grand tourer coupés produced by the German automaker BMW from 1968 to 1977. All models used the then-new M30 straight-6 engine. It marked BMW's return to the full-size luxury sedan market after a hiatus of 5 years and was introduced as a response to growing market segment dominated by Mercedes-Benz. It was important in establishing BMW's reputation as a maker of sporting, luxury sedans.

The BMW New Six coupés (better known as the BMW E9) are built on a shortened version of the E3 platform. The E9 coupés share engines, transmissions, suspension and many other features with the E3 sedans.

A total of 221,991 sedans and coupés were built.

Development

After a long hiatus, BMW decided to develop a six-cylinder car in the early 1960s. Work on what was to become the E3 commenced in 1965. The engine was based on the existing fours, sharing their overall layout while not merely an addition of two cylinders. The design team was led by Wilhelm Hofmeister, with some detail work executed by Italy's Bertone and Michelotti studios. A goal was to allow for more passenger space and comfort than the earlier "Neue Klasse" saloons had been able to offer. The new sedan was noticeably a "driver's car", focusing on the front-seat occupants, and the smaller coupé was only barely a full four-seater.

A new feature was the twin headlights, set into the grille, a design which was to define BMW styling for decades. Early mockups of the E3 featured broad rectangular single headlamps with rounded corners, but these never went into production - perhaps as a result of the lukewarm reception of the similarly designed 2000 CS. The new car also required a new welding plant at BMW's Munich site. In spite of the car's all-new construction it only cost 70 million D-mark to develop. This was less than half of what one might have expected at the time.

Nomenclature
Models were given names denoting their engine sizes, and suffixes to indicate the long-wheelbase (L) and fuel injection (i) available on later cars. The coupés were all named CS, followed by i (for fuel injection models) or L (for light-weight models, which also had fuel injection and higher power).

 2500/2.5, 2.5CS (2494 cc)
 2800/2.8, 2800CS (2788 cc)
 3.0S, 3.0L, 3.0CS (2985 cc,  using twin Zenith 35/40 INAT carburetors)
 3.3L, 3.3Li (3295 cc)
 3.3Li (3210 cc, 1976-1977)

Models 
The two initial models, introduced in 1968 and sold through 1977, were the 2.5 L 2500 and 2.8 L 2800. The airy design was roomier than BMW's existing range and appeared rather large, in spite of being no more than  longer than Mercedes' midrange sedans, which were generally considered to compete in a lower class than the new E3. They were large six-cylinder cars that handled well and impressed contemporary reviewers. Road & Track called the later Bavaria "delightful" and "superb", concluding that it was "one of the world's best buys". Aside from the larger engine, the 2800 also had bigger tyres and a somewhat sportier suspension, as well as various creature comforts such as a heated rear window, a full tool set, Boge Nivomat self-levelling rear suspension, and a smattering more external chrome.

The big-bore, dual-carbureted 3.0 S was introduced in 1971, being a more powerful and expensive model than the 2800; a fuel-injected version was also made. Also produced were long-wheelbase L models (3.0L, 3.3Li, etc.), whose sharp handling was a stark contrast to the large Mercedes-Benz models of the time. Langley Motors in Thames Ditton UK also produced an estate (tourer) version. With a fully independent suspension along with four wheel disc brakes, the E3 was well ahead of its time in the early 1970s. Surprisingly, considering their respective marketing profiles, the 3.0 Si sedan was faster than the 3.0 coupé; which was a heavier car by 50 kg, with the same drivetrain.

The body was surprisingly light for its size, weighing less than the smaller E9 coupé.

At the end of 1973 the new, larger 3.3 L was presented, going on sale in January 1974. It had the longer wheelbase and a bigger engine, although the power was no more than that of the 3.0 Si. Instead, more torque meant to provide a more luxurious rather than BMW's usual sporting feel. This engine was updated to fuel injection in June 1975, with a few more horsepower. Subsequent to the introduction of a 3.2 liter version of this engine in the 1976 BMW 633CSi, this slightly smaller model found its way into the 3.3 Li as well. The E3 Sedan was in production from 1968–1978, with a total of circa 190,000 cars produced. Of these, 71,804 were of the US-only "Bavaria" model.

North America

In the US market, the 2500 and 2800 were introduced in 1969. The 2500 was shy of many of the luxury features included in the 2800, and with the smaller engine, it sold for about $5600 in 1970-equal to $ today. The 2800 offered full leather interior, power windows, and power sunroof, which its price of $6,874 reflected. For the 1971 model year Max Hoffman, the BMW importer for the USA, convinced BMW AG to build the 2500 configuration car but use the 2800 engine — offering more power without the weight and expense of the 2800's luxury features. This new E3 configuration was called the "Bavaria" and was unique to the US market. Priced at about US$6,000, the  Bavaria came to replace both older models. It is generally considered the forebear of the modern BMW high-performance sedan as it combined brisk  acceleration, reasonable fuel economy, plenty of room for four people and a large trunk. The majority of them were sold with a four-speed manual transmission, reflecting the sporting nature of the sedan.

For the 1972 model year, the 2500 was dropped while the M30 engine size in the Bavaria was increased to 3.0 liters. The former 2800 was now called the 3.0 S reflecting the 3.0 liter engine. These two models, the 3.0 S and the Bavaria, made up the North American E3 sedan line-up for 1972 through 1974. For the 1974 model year the E3 received the ungainly, federally mandated  bumpers front and rear, significantly altering its profile.
 
In 1975 BMW introduced fuel injection to the US market M30 motor, replacing the twin two-barrel Zenith carburetors used since its inception. The Bavaria was dropped from the line-up, nominally replaced by the fuel-injected M30 powered E12 530i, and the fuel-injected 3.0 Si became the highest end of the BMW model range. The fully optioned 3.0 Si was sold during the 1975 and 1976 model years.

Bavaria Production:

Coupés (E9) 

The CS coupé models were based on the standard 2800 sedans, and looked very similar from the front. But they were also related to the earlier 2000CS, as is evident at the rear. The first model was the well-equipped 2800CS of 1968. The 3.0CS models introduced in 1971. In 1974 the smaller engined 2.5CS was made in small numbers, in response to the fuel crisis. The CSL models were lightweight racing versions.

References

External links 

 The Senior Six Registry - Dedicated to the E3

New Six
E3
Coupés
Sedans
Cars introduced in 1968
1970s cars